Heroes of the City is a Swedish computer-animated television series for preschool children, with stories about friendship, sharing and caring. The plots revolve around the emergency vehicles Paulie Police Car and Fiona Fire Engine who tackle a new mission in each episode.

Heroes of the City was created in Sweden in 2009, and is currently broadcast in over 70 countries. Season 1 was written by Swedish screenwriters, Season 2 mainly by American screenwriters.

Production credits

Season 1 (2012) 
Production: Ruta Ett DVD AB
Executive producer: Pelle Ferner
Creative consultant: Lennart Blixt
Voice recording: Hippeis Media
Music: Joakim Karlsson
Soundeffects: Elin Ferner
Editing: Pelle Ferner
Actors: Fiona Ash, Jennie Kirk, Joyce Jones, Andrew Pushkin, Lisa Hanam, James Williams, Oscar Teare, Thomas Fuller, Erik Stredwick, Jon Milward, Rachel Redfern and Dave Jolly
Heroes of the city was created by: Ruta Ett DVD AB
Director: Pelle Ferner
Script writer: Elin Ferner
Storyboard: Carolina Årnäs
Art director: Mattias Wennerfalk
Animation
Executive Producer: Shambhoo Phalke
Animation Director: Rahul Patil
Production Manager: Rakesh Tatia
Production Executive: Sonal Aswale
Animation Team Lead: Krishnaparasad CT
Reliance Media Works Ltd
Ruta ett DVD-PRODUKTION, Your Family Entertainment (credited as yourfamily entertainment)
© Ruta Ett DVD AB 2012

Season 2 (2014) 
Heroes of the City is created by Ruta Ett DVD AB
Producer and director: Pelle Ferner
Art director: Mattias Wennerfalk
Storyboard, modeling and textures: Mattias Wennerfalk, Carolina Årnäs, Anton Kirkhoff, Andrea Forsgren
Editing: Pelle Ferner
Title graphics: Sara Berntsson
Marketing and sales: Lennart Blixt
Business developer: Erik Foberg
Script: Baboon Animation
Writers: Joe Vitale, Anne D. Bernstein (credited as Anne Bernstein), Mike Setaro, Dave Benjoya, Mike de Seve, Jymn Magon, Karen de Seve, Peter K. Hirsch (credited as Peter Hirsch), Eric Shaw, Elin Ferner
Story editors: Mike de Seve, Elin Ferner
Animations: Reliance Media Works Ltd
Animation director: Rahul Patil
Animation co-ordinator: Vilas Rane
Animators: Sagar Kadam, Pankaj Kashid, Roshan Bagul, Gautam Prasad, Amit Sharma, Abhay Bansude
SFX and rig: Sanjay Kamble, Chirag Parmar, Gyandeep Das
Voice recording: Audioworks Producers Group
Voice director: Mike de Seve
Voice consultant: Kip Kaplan
Music: Joakim Karlsson
Sound effects and mixing: Elin Ferner
Ruta ett DVD-PRODUKTION
© Ruta Ett DVD AB 2014
Heroes of the City home page: www.hotc.nu

Series overview

References

2012 Swedish television series debuts
2014 Swedish television series endings
2010s children's television series
2010s preschool education television series
Computer-animated television series
Children's animated adventure television series
Animated action television series
Animated preschool education television series
AMC Networks International